Chizuru (written: 千鶴 lit. "thousand cranes") is a feminine Japanese given name. Notable people with the name include:

, Japanese judoka
, Japanese actress
, Japanese volleyball player
, pseudonym of Shizuka Ishikawa, Japanese voice actress
, Japanese sports shooter
, Japanese cross-country skier

Fictional characters
, a character in the manga series Squid Girl
, a character in the light novel series Student Council's Discretion
, a character in the manga series ReLIFE
, a character in the manga series Bokurano
, a character in the manga series YuruYuri
, a character in the video game series The King of Fighters
, a character in the light novel series Kanokon
, a main character in manga series Rent a Girlfriend
, a character in the manga series Negima!
, a character in the anime series Combattler V
, a character in the manga series Tonari no Kaibutsu-kun
, a character in Haikyū!!, the position is Wing Spiker and the number is #11
, a character in the visual novel Muv-Luv
, a character in the manga series Inubaka: Crazy for Dogs
, a character in the visual novel The Fruit of Grisaia
, a character in the manga series Tsuredure Children
, a character in the anime series Fafner in the Azure
, a character in manga series Kimi ni Todoke
, protagonist of the video game series Hakuōki
Chizuru Ichinose (一ノ瀬 ちづる), female protagonist of the anime Rent a Girlfriend

Japanese feminine given names